Ottawa County is a county located in the northwestern part of the U.S. state of Ohio. As of the 2020 census, the population was 40,364. Its county seat is Port Clinton. The county is named either for the Ottawa (Odawa) Indigenous peoples who lived there, or for an Indigenous word meaning "trader".

Ottawa County comprises the Port Clinton, OH Micropolitan Statistical Area, which is also included in the Toledo-Port Clinton, OH Combined Statistical Area.

History
On September 10, 1813, during the War of 1812, nine vessels of the United States Navy under Commodore Oliver Hazard Perry, decisively defeated six vessels of Great Britain’s Royal Navy in the Battle of Lake Erie near Put-in-Bay. This action was one of the major battles of the war.

Ottawa County was formed on March 6, 1840, from portions of Erie, Lucas and Sandusky counties. It was named after the North American Indigenous tribe of the Ottawa (Odawa).

In 1974, the County Courthouse was listed on the National Register of Historic Places.

The county is notable in presidential politics for being a recent bellwether, having continuously voted for the winning candidate for thirteen elections from 1964 to 2016.

Geography
It is the third-smallest county in Ohio by land area. It borders Ontario across Lake Erie.

Adjacent counties
 Essex County, Ontario, Canada (northeast)
 Erie County (southeast)
 Sandusky County (south)
 Wood County (west)
 Lucas County (northwest)

National protected areas
 Ottawa National Wildlife Refuge (part)
 Perry's Victory and International Peace Memorial

Demographics

2000 census
As of the census of 2000, there were 40,985 people, 16,474 households, and 11,729 families living in the county. The population density was 161 people per square mile (62/km2). There were 25,532 housing units at an average density of 100 per square mile (39/km2). The racial makeup of the county was 96.56% White, 0.65% Black or African American, 0.21% Native American, 0.23% Asian, 0.05% Pacific Islander, 1.44% from other races, and 0.87% from two or more races. 3.75% of the population were Hispanic or Latino of any race.

There were 16,474 households, out of which 29.10% had children under the age of 18 living with them, 58.90% were married couples living together, 8.50% had a female householder with no husband present, and 28.80% were non-families. 25.00% of all households were made up of individuals, and 11.20% had someone living alone who was 65 years of age or older. The average household size was 2.45 and the average family size was 2.92.

In the county, the population was spread out, with 23.30% under the age of 18, 6.70% from 18 to 24, 26.80% from 25 to 44, 26.80% from 45 to 64, and 16.40% who were 65 years of age or older. The median age was 41 years. For every 100 females there were 97.50 males. For every 100 females age 18 and over, there were 94.70 males.

The median income for a household in the county was $44,224, and the median income for a family was $51,919. Males had a median income of $39,823 versus $24,727 for females. The per capita income for the county was $21,973. About 4.20% of families and 5.90% of the population were below the poverty line, including 7.40% of those under age 18 and 5.40% of those age 65 or over.

2010 census
As of the 2010 United States Census, there were 41,428 people, 17,503 households, and 11,884 families living in the county. The racial makeup of the county was 96.5% white, 0.8% black or African American, 0.3% Asian, 0.2% American Indian, 0.9% from other races, and 1.3% from two or more races. Those of Hispanic or Latino origin made up 4.2% of the population. In terms of ancestry, 44.6% were German, 11.9% were Irish, 9.8% were English, 6.3% were American, and 6.1% were Polish.

Of the 17,503 households, 26.3% had children under the age of 18 living with them, 54.7% were married couples living together, 8.9% had a female householder with no husband present, 32.1% were non-families, and 27.4% of all households were made up of individuals. The average household size was 2.34 and the average family size was 2.82. The median age was 46.3 years.

The median income for a household in the county was $53,463 and the median income for a family was $64,258. Males had a median income of $52,736 versus $33,557 for females. The per capita income for the county was $27,809. About 6.3% of families and 9.0% of the population were below the poverty line, including 11.9% of those under age 18 and 6.5% of those age 65 or over.

Politics
Prior to 1912, Ottawa County was a Democratic Party stronghold in presidential elections. Starting with the 1912 election, the county was a national bellwether, only backing losing candidates in 1940, 1944, 1960 (Richard Nixon) and 2020 (Donald Trump).

|}

Government and politics

County officials
The County elects 9 officeholders.

Transportation

Major highways
8 major highways run through Ottawa County, including two interstates, and eight state routes.

  Interstate 80 (Ohio Turnpike)
  Interstate 90 (Ohio Turnpike)
  Ohio State Route 2
  Ohio State Route 19
  Ohio State Route 51
  Ohio State Route 53
  Ohio State Route 105
  Ohio State Route 163
  Ohio State Route 269
  Ohio State Route 590

Airports
 Erie-Ottawa Regional Airport
 Middle Bass-East Point Airport
 Middle Bass Island Airport
 North Bass Island Airport
 Put-in-Bay Airport

Communities

City
 Port Clinton (county seat)

Villages

 Clay Center
 Elmore
 Genoa
 Marblehead
 Oak Harbor
 Put-in-Bay
 Rocky Ridge

Townships 

 Allen
 Bay
 Benton
 Carroll
 Catawba Island
 Clay
 Danbury
 Erie
 Harris
 Portage
 Put-in-Bay
 Salem

https://web.archive.org/web/20160715023447/http://www.ohiotownships.org/township-websites

Census-designated places
 Curtice
 Lakeside
 Williston

Unincorporated communities
 Catawba Island
 Danbury
 Elliston
 Forest Park
 Graytown
 Gypsum
 Isle St. George
 Lacarne
 Lakeside Marblehead
 Martin
 Middle Bass

Notable residents
 Louis C. Shepard - American Civil War Medal of Honor recipient from Ashtabula County, buried in Lakeview cemetery, Port Clinton, Ohio.
 Crystal Bowersox, singer-songwriter, runner up on American Idol

See also
 National Register of Historic Places listings in Ottawa County, Ohio

References

External links
 Ottawa County Government's website

 
1840 establishments in Ohio
Populated places established in 1840
Ohio counties in the Western Reserve